Constituency WR-06 is a reserved seat for women in the Khyber Pakhtunkhwa Assembly.

2013
Zareen Riaz

See also
 Constituency PK-74 (Lakki Marwat-I)
 Constituency PK-75 (Lakki Marwat-II)
 Constituency PK-76 (Lakki Marwat-III)

References

Khyber Pakhtunkhwa Assembly constituencies